Bur Kheyl-e Arateh (also Romanized as Būr Kheyl-e Araţeh; also known as Būr Kheyl) is a village in Bisheh Sar Rural District, in the Central District of Qaem Shahr County, Mazandaran Province, Iran. At the 2006 census, its population was 898, in 239 families.

References 

Populated places in Qaem Shahr County